Futaysi Airport  is an airfield located on Al Futaisi island, United Arab Emirates.

References

Airports in the United Arab Emirates